David Rhodes (20 June 1847 — 22 December 1937) was an English-born New Zealand cricketer who played for Otago. He was born in Huddersfield and died in Melbourne.

Rhodes made a single first-class appearance for the side, during the 1874–75 season, against Canterbury. From the tailend, he scored a duck in the first innings in which he batted, and 1 not out in the second.

See also
 List of Otago representative cricketers

External links
David Rhodes at Cricket Archive 

1847 births
1937 deaths
New Zealand cricketers
Otago cricketers